Shurabeh-ye Vosta Do (also Romanized as Shūrābeh-ye Vostá Do; also known as Shūrābeh-ye Vostá and Sūlābeh-ye Pā’īn) is a village in Kunani Rural District, Kunani District, Kuhdasht County, Lorestan Province, Iran. At the 2006 census, its population was 192, in 40 families.

References 

Towns and villages in Kuhdasht County